"Mujeres in the Club" is the first single by Puerto Rican reggaeton duo Wisin & Yandel from their  album La Revolución, released on April 14, 2009 by UMG and features rapper 50 Cent. Yandel uses the Auto-Tune effect in his vocals. The song is nominated for Best Urban Song at the Latin Grammy Awards of 2009.

Music video
The music video for "Mujeres in the Club" was directed by Jessy Terrero, Wisin & Yandel's long-time working music video director. It was released by Universal Music Group on April 17, 2009 on YouTube and premiered on MTV Tr3s on April 14, 2009. The video is set in 2050 when the world has destroyed itself and features 50 Cent and a cameo by Julissa Bermudez. To date the video has received over 4,900,000 views through its posting by UMG.

Track listing
Digital single

References

External links
 (WYMusic)
 (UMG)

2009 songs
50 Cent songs
Music videos directed by Jessy Terrero
Wisin & Yandel songs
Songs written by 50 Cent
Spanglish songs
Songs written by Wisin
Songs written by Yandel
Songs written by Nesty (producer)